The , signed as Route 13, is one of the tolled routes of the Hanshin Expressway system serving the Keihanshin area in Kansai, Japan. It travels in a west to east direction from the Chūō ward of Osaka, beginning at a junction with the Loop Route and Ōsakakō Route, to the Daini Hanna Road in the city of Higashiōsaka.

Route description

The Higashi-Osaka Route travels in a west to east direction from the Chūō ward of Osaka, beginning as a one-way highway at a junction with the Loop Route and Ōsakakō Route on the western side of the Loop Route. Its next junction is a second interchange with the Loop Route on that highway's eastern side. Heading east towards Higashiōsaka and Nara, the expressway is an elevated highway running directly over the Yumehanna rail line.

When utilized with the Daini Hanna Road at the eastern end of the Higashi-Osaka Route, the combined expressways function as the most direct road connection between the city centers of Osaka and Nara.

History
Construction of the Higashi-Osaka Route began in 1967 in preparation for the Expo '70 held in the nearby city of Suita. The first section of the expressway was completed after three years of construction in 1970. The entire expressway was completed by 1976, with the exception of a short section between Osaka Castle and Naniwa Nagara-Toyosaki Palace that was left unbuilt until 1978. 

This section's completion was delayed due to the discovery of a trace of a palace that was found along the expressway's route during a survey done in 1960. In order to preserve the archaeological site, the elevated expressway had to be built using a structure that did not require piles. A lightweight superstructure was used to elevate the road above the site, but the structure was deemed deficient after fractures developed in it after years of use. The structure was temporarily reinforced, but it has been determined by the Hanshin Expressway Company that it will need to be replaced with a stronger structure in the future.

List of interchanges
The entire expressway lies within Osaka Prefecture.

See also

References

External links
 

Roads in Osaka Prefecture
13
1970 establishments in Japan